The New Zealand Fire Brigades Long Service and Good Conduct Medal is a meritorious and long service award for members of recognized fire services in New Zealand who have completed 14 years of service.

Criteria
The New Zealand Fire Brigades Long Service and Good Conduct Medal may be awarded for 14 years full or part-time service as a member of the New Zealand Fire Service or a fire brigade or service operated, maintained by, or registered with the New Zealand Fire Service Commission or a Government Department of New Zealand.  Members of company fire brigades are also eligible for the medal upon completion of the requisite period of service.

Appearance
The medal is circular, silver, and 38 millimeters in diameter. On the obverse is the crowned effigy of the Sovereign.  The reverse bears the inscription New Zealand Fire Brigades around the edge and For Long Service and Good Conduct at the centre, with a fern frond to the right side. The medal hangs from a vermilion ribbon 32 mm wide with a narrow centre stripe of black bordered by yellow.

References

New Zealand Meritorious & Long Service Awards
Fire service awards and honors
Civil awards and decorations of New Zealand
Long and Meritorious Service Medals of Britain and the Commonwealth